Dianthidium is a genus of leafcutter, mason, and resin bees in the family Megachilidae. There are at least 20 described species in Dianthidium.

Species

References

Further reading

 
 
 
 
 
 

Megachilidae